The National Chamber Ensemble (NCE) is an American classical music ensemble founded in 2007 by violinist Leonid Sushansky.

The NCE became Artisphere's Ensemble-in-Residence when Artisphere opened in October 2010. The NCE performs music ranging from classical to contemporary compositions, bringing together composers, musicians and performers from the Washington DC metropolitan area as well as hosting visiting guest artists.

References

Chamber music groups
Musical groups from Washington, D.C.
Musical groups established in 2007
2007 establishments in Washington, D.C.